The following is a timeline of the history of the city of Reggio Calabria, Italy.

Prior to 20th century

 8th century BCE - Reghion established by Chalcidian Greeks.
 386 BCE - Town sacked by forces of Dionysius I of Syracuse.
 91 BCE - Earthquake.(it)
 89 BCE - Rhegium becomes a Roman municipium.
 17 CE - Earthquake.(it)
 362 CE - Earthquake.(it)
 410 CE - Reggio sacked by forces of Alaric.
 458 - Reggio taken by forces of Totila.
 550 - Roman Catholic diocese of Reggio Calabria established (approximate date).
 950 - Reggio taken by Muslim forces.
 1059 - Reggio taken by Norman forces.
 1783 - Earthquake.
 1806 - Administrative  established.
 1818
 Regia Biblioteca Ferdinandiana (library) established.
 Real Teatro Borbonio (theatre) opens.
 1852 - Archivio di Calabria Ultra Prima (archives) opens.
 1860
 21 August: ; Garibaldian forces win.
  (administrative region) established.
 1866 - Railway station opens; Reggio Calabria - Lazzaro railway begins operating.
 1894 - .
 1895 - Battipaglia–Reggio di Calabria railway begins operating.
 1896 -  (park) opens.
 1897 - Population: 46,399.

20th century

 1904 -  newspaper begins publication.
 1908 - December: Earthquake.
 1911 - Population: 43,162.
 1913 - Scilla Lighthouse built at  near city.
 1914 - Unione Sportiva Reggio Calabria, a football club, was formed.
 1918 -  begins operating.
 1920 -  (library) active.
 1921 -  built.
 1922
 Il Popolo di Calabria newspaper in publication.
  theatre opens.
 1931 -  (theatre) built.
 1932 - Stadio Michele Bianchi (stadium) opens.
 1935 -  built.
 1938 - Reggio di Calabria Centrale railway station rebuilt.
 1939 - Reggio Calabria Airport established.
 1943 -  during World War II.
 1953 -  begins publication.
 1967 - Accademia di Belle Arti di Reggio Calabria (art school) established.
 1970 - July: Reggio revolt begins.
 1982 - University of Reggio Calabria active.
 1999 - Stadio Oreste Granillo (stadium) opens.

21st century

 2013 - Population: 180,686.
 2014 - Giuseppe Falcomatà becomes mayor.

See also
 Reggio Calabria history
 
 
 List of mayors of Reggio Calabria
 List of bishops of Reggio Calabria
 
  region

Other cities in the macroregion of South Italy:(it)
 Timeline of Bari, Apulia region
 Timeline of Brindisi, Apulia
 Timeline of L'Aquila, Abruzzo region
 Timeline of Naples, Campania region
 Timeline of Salerno, Campania
 Timeline of Taranto, Apulia

References

This article incorporates information from the Italian Wikipedia.

Bibliography

in English

in Italian
 
 
 
  (bibliography)

External links

 Items related to Reggio Calabria, various dates (via Europeana)
 Items related to Reggio Calabria, various dates (via Digital Public Library of America)

Reggio Calabria
Reggio Calabria
reggio